Halla Gulla is a 2015 Pakistani romantic comedy film directed by Kamran Akbar Khan and produced by Hanif Mohammad under production banner S.E Films. The film stars Javed Sheikh, Ismail Tara, Asim Mehmood, Sidra Batool in lead along with Muneeb Butt, Ghazala Javed, Ashraf Khan, Adil Wadia, Zara Gull, Jasmeen, Maryam Ansari, Hina Rizvi, Hunain Maniar and Bilal Yousufzai.

The film was distributed by IMGC Global Entertainment and Geo Films on 25 September 2015 (Eid al-adha) in cinemas nationwide.

Cast 
 Asim Mehmood as Saahil
 Sidra Batool as Muskarahat
 Muneeb Butt as Udaas
 Javed Sheikh as Golden Bhai (DON)
 Ismail Tara 
 Ghazala Javed
 Ashraf Khan
 Zara Gul
 Jasmeen
 Adil Wadia
 Maryam Ansari
 Hina Rizvi as Chatpati
 Hunain Maniar

Release
The film was scheduled to release on 28 August 2015, but later it was postponed for 25 September 2015 (Eid al-adha) release along with Jawani Phir Nahi Ani.

Marketing 
The first look posters of film were revealed on 11 November 2014. Video of item song titled Ishq Kamla was released on 23 November on YouTube. Theatrical trailer and poster was revealed on 3 June 2015 but after rescheduling of film release date, new poster was revealed on 4 September. Title song of the film was released by 8XM on 7 September at 6:21 pm. The film cast visited several private universities to promote the film.

Soundtrack
 "Halla Gulla" – Sahir Ali Bagga, Kunal Ganjawala, Beena Khan
 "Saroor De" – Afshan Fawad, Rahat Fateh Ali Khan
 "Thumka" – Sana Zulfiqar, Kunal Ganjawala, Sahir Ali Bagga
 "Kamla" – Sana Zulfiqar
 "Zero Meter" - Sana Zulfiqar, Malko

Reception

Critical reception
The film had negative reviews overall. Momin Ali Munshi of Galaxy Lollywood rated the film 2/5 stars and summed up his review as "Halla Gulla terms itself as 'Pakistan's First Solid Entertainer' but do not let this fool you as it is anything but entertainment. The director has no idea what he is doing with the film and needs to take direction lessons. Except for the two leading actors there is nothing that works for the film and it would not be wrong to claim that this film is a disaster of epic proportions." Rashid Nazir Ali of Reviewit.pk verdict his review as "Halla Gulla is a weak and unimpressive effort from Kamran Akbar Khan."

See also
 List of Pakistani films of 2015

References

External links 
 
 
 

Lollywood films
2010s Urdu-language films
Pakistani romantic comedy films
2015 films
2015 romantic comedy films
Films scored by Sahir Ali Bagga
2015 directorial debut films